St Norbert College (SNC) is a private Catholic secondary school in Queens Park, Perth, Western Australia. Founded in 1965 by Peter O’Reilly O Praem, John Reynolds O Praem, Norbertine priests and educators, the school was named after Saint Norbert of Xanten. In 1976, the college became coeducational and currently enrols about 890 students.

History

In 1959, Peter O'Reilly O Praem, John Reynolds O Praem and Stephen Cooney O Praem travelled to Western Australia from Kilnacrott in Ireland.  The original intention was to establish a boys’ boarding school in York. This did not eventuate but the Norbertines have maintained a presence in the York parish until the present date.

In 1964, Archbishop Prendiville invited the Norbertine Canons to establish a boys’ school in Queens Park. St Norbert College was officially blessed by the Rt. Rev. F C Colwell O Praem, Abbot of Kilnacrott, on 7 February 1965. In that year, less than thirty students were enrolled in one Year 6 class.

The College expanded by one class each year until 1971 when the first students entered for the Leaving Certificate examinations. By this time, enrolments in Lower Secondary necessitated double streaming of classes. The College only enrolled boys until 1976, when girls were enrolled in Year 8. The College eventually eliminated lower grades, enrolling Year 8 through 12, with the neighbouring St Joseph's Primary School enrolling Year 1 through 7. Staffing patterns have reflected the changing nature of enrolments at the College. In 1966, two Norbertines formed the staff, with Laurence Anderson O Praem as Headmaster. By 2005, 50 teaching staff were supported by 22 administrative and maintenance staff. In 2016, there were 111 teaching and non-teaching staff at St Norbert College.

In 2008, new science facilities and a refurbished Administration Centre were completed.

In 2010, the College began enrolling students in Year 7, in accordance with the Catholic Education Commission of Western Australia's expanded enrolment parameters. A new building, the Cappenburg Centre, was also blessed and opened in 2010. Italian and Japanese classes are held in the Cappenburg Centre, which is also the home of the school's Careers Office. In 2016, the school celebrated being founded for 50 years.

Principals

Campus
St Norbert College has developed into a school with facilities set within  of landscaped grounds. Facilities include:
 Language Centre
 Design Studio for Photography and Technical Graphics
 Trade Training Centre
 Music Centre
 Sporting facilities that include gymnasium and  swimming pool
 Theatre and Performing Arts Centre
 Science laboratories

Facilities at the College have expanded in accordance with growing student numbers at the school and strategic planning through the Management Advisory Board. The first expansion of facilities took place in four stages until 1976. Initially, three classrooms met requirements. However, 1968, 1971 and 1974 saw additions which provided Language and Science Laboratories, Library and Administration Blocks, as well as general classrooms. Manual Arts and Home Economics courses commenced in the new McMullen Centre in 1977.

During 1978 the Connell Centre, containing facilities for Mathematics and Science, was completed. The Dawkins Centre received its first students in 1979 and the O’Sullivan-Devine Centre catering for Art, Business Studies, Music and Language began operating in 1980.

In 1986 there were further additions to the Connell Centre (Magdeburg) in the form of a computing room, a staff preparation area and one classroom.

In 1993, Stage 1 of a new three-stage Capital Development Plan was completed. This stage involved a complete re-location of the administration and clerical services, refurbishing of the original St Joseph's block, the building of three new classrooms, two meeting rooms, a new staffroom and a 'state-of-the-art' Word Processing/Computer Room. Stage 2 included an ongoing process of updating the grounds and gardens.

The Fr Peter O’Reilly Multi-purpose Recreation Centre, Stage 3 of the plan, was completed at the end of 1998 and opened in 1999. This outstanding facility has been most beneficial to the College sporting program and is an excellent venue for assemblies and other formal gatherings of the College community.

The year 2000 witnessed an upgrade to the Photography teaching area and the creation of a new Music classroom. Significant improvements were made to Art facilities and extra provision was made for external seating for students.

In 2008, the Science facilities were all located in the Magdeburg block and totally refurbished with contemporary science facilities including access to smart board technology. The Administration area was also extended and refurbished to extend Student Services and provide a modern and welcoming Reception area. Rooms in the new facility were named to reflect the Norbertine charism and saints. The College Board Room, Koinonia, and meeting rooms reflect significant Norbertine Saints and Blesseds – Kern, Siard, Evermode, Gibert and Isfrid.

In 2009, with the introduction of Year 7 students planned for 2010, the Br Patrick Doolan Learning Centre was built. This building was designed around contemporary pedagogical practices and provides five learning areas, an open area, the Forum, staff facilities and a Reading Room attached to the Prémontré Library. The Canteen was demolished to make way for this Centre and a new Cafe 135@Treasure, was established in what was previously the ‘sewing room’. The Café is self-service and provides healthy eating options for students before school and during student breaks. A new Design and Technology: Textiles Studio is now located in Xanten House and enables students to complete all aspects of textile design and construction comfortably. It also provides for the Design Studio (2011) and Design Room (2011).

An extensive shade structure outside Cafe 135, total refurbishments of the current exterior courts, construction of one new court and major works to the swimming pool storage facilities and pump house were also completed in 2009.

In 2010 the Cappenburg and the Floreffe Trade Training Centre were completed. The Cappenburg Centre has provided contemporary 21st century technology and learning spaces for students of language. The Trade Training Centre provides training in the area of plumbing and painting and decorating in partnership with MBA Skills.

In 2011, attention to student comfort prompted the development of Ricvera Court adjacent to the Café, Gilbert Court adjacent to the Fr Peter O’Reilly Centre and Isfrid Place behind the Centre with facilities to ‘build community’. In 2011, courtyards have been named to capture Norbertine Saints: Ludolph, Gilbert, Adrian, James, Hugh and Isfrid provide an enduring connection to our Norbertine heritage. Sayn Court gives place to an ancient Norbertine community.

A Capital Development Plan was agreed upon in 2015, and the following year a new Performing Arts Centre was built as part of this plan. The work included an extension of the Xanten Theatre, and was completed in early 2017. The new building includes a dance studio that doubles as a green room, a music classroom with multiple practice rooms, dressing rooms, and an external amphitheatre for outdoor performances.

College life
The pastoral care program in the College is based on vertical Homerooms within a House structure, introduced in 1997. Under this organisation, each Homeroom consists of approximately 25 students from Years 7 to 12. There are seven Homerooms in each House and it is envisaged that the Homeroom teachers will remain with the same Homeroom from one year to the next, giving the students continuity and stability and allowing Homeroom teachers to oversee a student's program of study over six years. The vertical Homeroom system provides senior students with the opportunity to develop their leadership skills. Finally, the vertical Homeroom system encourages a sense of belonging by each student to a relatively small group, creating a feeling of 'family' and community. House Captains are senior students who have been selected to support the Head of House. College Captains and an elected Student Representative Council act as a liaison between the College Administration and the student body, and act as ambassadors for the College at public events.

To assist in the coordination of all aspects of Homeroom, the 35 Homerooms are organised into five Houses, each with an appointed Head of House. Each house is named after a place of considerable significance to the Norbertine Order. Many aspects of College life operate under the House system. It is recognised that the enduring House system provides a strong pastoral care structure for the College.

Co-curricular
The College provides a co-curricular program.

Academic
Students are able to join any Academic co-curricular activity. These are conducted afterschool. Some activities have competitions that are associated with the Club, while others work on projects.
 WA Junior Mathematics Olympiad Competition
 Have Sum Fun Mathematics Competition
 Science Club
 Forensic Club
 IT Programing Club
 Italian Club
 Environment Club
 Drama Club
 Art Club
 Sewing Club
 Homework Help
 Philosophy Club

Sport

Teams representing St Norbert College compete in a range of interschool competitions throughout the year. During Terms 1 and 2, the College participates in team sporting competitions as part of the Southern Associated Schools (SAS) competition. In 2018, teams representing St Norbert College competed in cricket, touch rugby, netball, soccer, Australian Rules football and basketball. Junior and Senior teams also compete in the Champion Schools Competition for soccer and basketball; while Junior teams participate in an AFL Carnival in Term 2. 
Each year students at St Norbert College take part in three major sporting carnivals, representing their Houses. These are the Interhouse Swimming Carnival, the Interhouse Cross Country Carnival, and the Interhouse Athletics Carnival. Selected teams from St Norbert College also compete in the Associated and Catholic Colleges (ACC) carnivals for each of the three aforementioned disciplines. In 2017, St Norbert College won the 'E' Division ACC Swimming Carnival. In the ACC Cross Country Carnival, St Norbert College finished 28th overall out of 67 schools. Competing in the 'B' Division ACC Athletics Carnival, St Norbert College finished third in 2017.

Students enrolled in the Specialised Basketball Program receive expert coaching from College staff who are accredited coaches with playing backgrounds in the SBL. Year 8 to 10 students can achieve Basketball WA certified qualifications in coaching, sports medicine awareness, scoring and refereeing. Year 11 and 12 students can receive WACE graduation credit, as the Specialised Basketball Program is an endorsed program, use their skills as part of WACE practical assessment in Physical Education Studies and complete a VET Certificate II in Sport and Recreation. The Specialised Basketball Program conducts regular tours to the US, where students have a chance to test their skills against High Schools in California, visit College campuses and experience an NBA game.

The Canons Swim Squad is a developmental swimming squad designed for students to improve physical fitness and their swimming technique. Training occurs before school with a qualified swimming coach during terms 1 and 4.

Student ministry
Student ministry is an important aspect of life at St Norbert College. Student ministers are given the opportunity to lead and to grow as Christian leaders of the College community. They are inspired to act and to live their faith by the opportunities they are given. The
following are undertakings of the Student Ministry Centre:
 Retreats. Each Year group participates in a one-day Reflection/Retreat Day each year. In Years 11 and 12 students are invited to attend the Kairos retreat, which is a three-night, four-day live-in Retreat experience.
 Christian Service Learning. Students from Years 7–10 participate in a compulsory service learning program each year with a particular focus. In Years 11 and 12 students are invited and encouraged to complete service learning hours within the community. The focus for each Year group is as follows: Year 7 Service to Norbie Care; Year 8 Serving at Home; Year 9 Serving at School; Year 10 “Prepared for all good works” – Service to the Community – not-for-profit agencies; Years 11–12 “A call to serve” – voluntary service program.
 Almsgiving. Each term the students and staff fundraise for particular Catholic agencies and charities within our local, national and international communities. Students are also encouraged to donate to the Shopfront Winter Appeal and the Emmaus Community Christmas Appeal.
 Liturgy. Students participate in various liturgical celebrations throughout the year including Benediction, Masses, prayer services and Liturgies.
 Immersions. Each year the College offers an Immersion experience to students to either Cambodia or the Kimberley. These experience provide the students an opportunity to immerse themselves in the culture of others and engage in some service type activities in a different setting.

Notable alumni
 Peter Bol, Olympic middle-distance runner.
 Pete Curulli, MIX 94.5FM radio host.
 Robyn van Nus, Olympic shooter.
 Gabriella Rogers, reporter for Nine News.
 Scott Walker, Olympic bobsleigh team member.

References

External links

 St Norbert College Home
 Catholic Education Office Perth

Educational institutions established in 1965
Premonstratensian Order
Catholic universities and colleges in Australia
Catholic secondary schools in Perth, Western Australia
1965 establishments in Australia